Orculella astirakiensis is a species of air-breathing land snail, a terrestrial pulmonate gastropod mollusc in the family Orculidae.

Geographic distribution
O. astirakiensis is endemic to Greece, where it is only known from a small area in Irakleio, Crete.

See also
List of non-marine molluscs of Greece

References 

Orculidae
Molluscs of Europe
Endemic fauna of Crete
Gastropods described in 2004